Gocha Khugaev, (Russian: Гоча Олегович Хугаев) (born 16 July 1984) is a Russian athlete who competes in disability athletics in the F58 category. At the 2012 European Championships Khugaev set a European record whilst winning the 200 metres. He also won gold in the long jump in a combined F37/38 class, however an illegal wind reading of 2.4 m/s prevented him from setting a world record. Khugaev set a F37 world record for the long jump at the London Paralympic Games as he won gold in a combined F37/38 class.

References

World record holders in Paralympic athletics
1984 births
Living people
Medalists at the 2012 Summer Paralympics
Athletes (track and field) at the 2012 Summer Paralympics
Paralympic gold medalists for Russia
Paralympic athletes of Russia
Russian male long jumpers
Russian male sprinters
Sportspeople from Vladikavkaz
Paralympic medalists in athletics (track and field)